Telephone operator may refer to:


Telecommunications
 Switchboard operator, a person who provides assistance to telephone callers
 Telephone company, one that offers telephone services to subscribers
 Mobile network operator, a phone carrier

Film
 The Telephone Operator (1925 film), a German silent comedy film
 The Telephone Operator (1932 film), an Italian comedy film
 Telephone Operator (film), a 1937 American drama film
 The Telephone Operator (1954 film), a West German musical romance film

Music
 "Telephone Operator", a song by Pete Shelley from the 1983 album XL1

See also
 Operator (disambiguation)